Victorian bias in the Australian Football League is an assertion by critics of the Australian Football League (AFL) that there is an intrinsic bias towards the Victorian based clubs of that competition. Causes of the alleged bias range from it being attributed to the fact that the AFL evolved from the Victorian Football League (VFL) resulting in a majority of the AFL's teams being located in the state of Victoria, to it being the result of intentional favouritism by the competitions administration towards Victorian clubs.

Background
In 1982 the VFL relocated the South Melbourne Football Club to Sydney in New South Wales with the following decade seeing the competition established clubs in all Australian mainland states. By 1997 there were 10 clubs located in Victoria and 6 clubs located outside of that the state. After a further series of expansion clubs being introduced the AFL consists of 8 clubs outside Victoria whilst retaining 10 clubs inside it. This imbalance of clubs inside and outside Victoria is often cited as the main, or even only, cause of any bias.

Commonly cited examples of bias
Assertions of bias towards Victorian based clubs in the AFL are multifaceted.

Grand Final location

The location of the AFL Grand Final is often the subject of allegations of Victorian bias in the AFL due to it being indefinitely being hosted at the Melbourne Cricket Ground.

Travel burden 
Due to the unequal distribution of teams based inside and outside Victoria, non-Victorian based players are required to travel far greater distances during their careers. This travel burden discrepancy is highlighted by comparing the distance travelled by West Coast Eagles players Darren Glass, Daniel Kerr, Mark LeCras, Quinten Lynch and Chris Masten all travelling over 515,000 km in their first 200 games compared to Collingwood players Ben Johnson, Alan Didak, Dane Swan, Josh Fraser and Travis Cloke all travelling less than 96,000 km for their first 200 appearances in the AFL.

Fixturing
As a result of the majority of the 18 AFL clubs being based in Victoria the competitions fixture provides an unequal distribution of the required travel burden to carry out a season.

Friday night broadcasts 
Friday nights are regarded as the premier time slot for AFL fixtures as they are broadcast nationally on free to air subsequently generating the largest TV audiences of the week for the competition. Victorian clubs often dominate the Friday night fixture and this it is largely asserted that this is the result of broadcasters preference for those matches to involve Melbourne teams as that city is the largest market for the competition.

Public Holiday games
The AFL fixture has a heavy bias towards providing Victorian clubs with stand alone public holiday fixtures.

ANZAC Day 
The ANZAC Day fixture has been perpetually held in Victoria at the Melbourne Cricket Ground since 1995 between Collingwood and Essendon and is often cited as example of a Victorian centric approach to commemorating the national public holiday.

Media

Player appraisals 
As a result of both the AFL administrative headquarters (AFL House) and the majority of the league's teams being located in Victoria the majority of the competitions associated media is based in Victoria. As a result it is asserted that the media that covers the game has a bias towards Victorian clubs and particularly Victorian based players with critics suggesting that players of Victorian clubs garner a higher profile compared to their non-Victorian counterparts.

Clash Uniform Policy 
Supporters of non-Victorian clubs often complain about the AFL's clash uniform policy which is lenient on Victorian based clubs but strongly upheld for non-Victorian clubs. Richmond, Carlton and Collingwood are often singled out as almost never adhering to the AFL's 'Clash Uniform Policy'. However in more recent times Richmond have been more accepting of the policy, wearing a full clash uniform for the 2017 AFL Grand Final.

Subsidisation 
There have been claims that supporters of non-Victorian clubs pay higher ticket prices than those in Melbourne with the former effectively subsiding the latter.

Father-son rule 
The AFL draft includes a father-son rule, allowing clubs priority access to recruit the sons of former players. During the first two decades of the non-Victorian clubs' existences, this rule applied unequally to Victorian and non-Victorian clubs: for Victorian clubs, it applied to sons whose fathers who had played 100 games for their club; for Western Australian clubs, it applied to sons whose fathers had played 150 games for one of four WAFL clubs; and for South Australian clubs, it applied to sons whose fathers had played 200 games for one of four or six SANFL clubs. This was supposed to create a roughly equitable outcome, but failed in practice, with very few South Australian or Western Australian sons ever recruited under the state-league eligibility rule.

Australian Football Hall of Fame

The Australian Football Hall of Fame has been criticised by football writers and historians for being heavily biased towards figures from Victoria. The initial selection committee was made up of 11 Victorians, one South Australian and one Western Australian, with the current selection committee being made up of six Victorians, two Western Australians and one South Australian. Of the 136 inaugural inductees into the Hall of Fame, 116 played substantial parts of their careers in Victoria, with eleven of the thirteen "Legends" from Victoria.

Claims of non-Victorian advantages
It is often argued by Victorian football commentators that the non-Victorian teams have the only real home ground advantages in the competition as they host travelling sides every second week whereas Victorian clubs are often hosting games against other Victorian clubs resulting in neutral fixtures in regards to home ground advantage.

Melbourne bias in the AFL
It is sometimes argued by supporters of  that instead of there being a Victorian bias in the AFL it is actually a Melbourne bias with the club often being forced to play home games in the neighbouring city instead of in Geelong.

It is also suggested that the AFL revenue stream is more profitable from large Victorian Clubs succeeding in the regular season and playing finals, almost a desired top 8 of rich Victorian Clubs.

An AFL top 8 featuring high membership Victorian Clubs attracts larger TV viewership and therefore higher audience, which all helps with TV rights negotiations.

See also
New South Wales selection bias

References

Australian Football League
Australian rules football controversies
Discrimination in Australia
Employment discrimination
Bias